The Peyret-Abrial A-5 Rapace, also called the  Abrial A-5 Rapace, was a glider designed by Georges Abrial in France during the 1920s, assisted by Louis Peyret and Professor Toussant. The aircraft flew for the first time in 1928.

Design and development 
The A-5 Rapace was constructed primarily of wood, with high set monoplane wings.

Specifications (A-5 Rapace)

1920s French sailplanes
Peyret aircraft
Glider aircraft
Aircraft first flown in 1928
High-wing aircraft